I'll Cry If I Want To is the debut album of Lesley Gore. The album included her hit singles "It's My Party" and its follow-up, "Judy's Turn to Cry". The album was rushed out after "It's My Party" became a big hit, and the songs are mostly about crying, linking to the hit single's first line "It's my party and I'll cry if I want to", incorporating songs with titles such as "Cry", "Just Let Me Cry" and "Cry and You Cry Alone". Besides the hit singles, the album included pop standards such as "Misty", "Cry Me a River" and "What Kind of Fool Am I?". The album reached number 24 on the US Billboard 200. Edsel Records released the album on Compact Disc in 2000 in combination with Gore's second album, Lesley Gore Sings of Mixed-Up Hearts. The album was named the 181st best album of the 1960s by Pitchfork.

Track listing

Charts

Singles

References

Lesley Gore albums
Albums arranged by Claus Ogerman
1963 debut albums
Mercury Records albums
Albums produced by Quincy Jones